The Church of St. Anthony of Padua is a Roman Catholic parish church under the jurisdiction of the Roman Catholic Diocese of Penang located in the town of Teluk Intan, Perak, Malaysia.

History

The origin of the church dates back to 1894 when the French missionary priest, Rev. Father René-Michel-Marie Fée, MEP acquired a piece of land and built an attap roofed wooden chapel as part of the larger Parish of South Perak which included Tapah. The chapel was dedicated to St. Anthony of Padua. 

The Rev. Father Fée was elevated to become the Bishop of Malacca in 1896  and was succeeded by the Rev. Father Louis Perrichon who ministered to the scattered Roman Catholic communities along the Tapah - Kuala Kubu Baru road. In 1910, a presbytery was built in the compound of the chapel during the watch of the sixth parish priest, the Rev. Father Donat Perrissoud, who also extended his pastoral ministry to the townships of Lumut and Sitiawan. 

In 1914, the original wood and attap chapel was destroyed in a fire. Funds amounting to 70,000 Straits dollars was successfully raised and work begun on the building of a new church with the foundation stone laid on 7 May 1922.  The new church building was consecrated on 6 May 1923 by Bishop Jean-Marie Mérel, Vicar-Apostolic Emeritus of Canton.  

Today, weekly masses are held in Tamil and English while masses in Mandarin and Malay are held once a month.

Pastors

The following have served as pastors of the parish since its formation in 1894:

St. Anthony's School

The tenth parish priest, the Rev. Father Michel Bonamy, established a school known as St. Anthony's School in a wooden hut adjacent to the church.  His successor, the Rev. Father John Edmond, acquired a piece of land opposite the church for the school and the first block of six classrooms was built on this land and officially opened by the British Resident of Perak, Marcus Rex, on 27 January 1941.

See also

 Roman Catholicism in Malaysia
 Christianity in Malaysia

References

External links

 St. Anthony's Church, Teluk Intan
 Diocese of Penang - Church of St. Anthony, Teluk Intan

20th-century Roman Catholic church buildings in Malaysia
Churches in Perak
Roman Catholic churches in Malaysia
Teluk Intan